Izidore Musallam is a Palestinian film director, producer and screenwriter who most recently produced the Sci Fi Pictures original film: Savage Planet. He was born in Haifa and graduated with a BFA in film production from York University in Toronto, Ontario, Canada where he now lives and works.

He directed a number of movies including "Foreign Nights" (1989), "Nothing To Lose" (1994), "Heaven Before I Die" (1997), "Adam & Eve" (2002) aka "Forbidden Fruit" and "Hadutha Saghira" (2009).

Most notably he directed in 2006 Keif al-Hal?, the first ever Saudi Arabian feature film produced by Rotana.

See also
Keif al-Hal?

References

External links

Living people
Palestinian film directors
People from Haifa
Year of birth missing (living people)